Mai Kuraki Live Project 2018 "Red It be: Kimi Omou Shunkashūtō" is the twenty-second video album by Japanese singer-songwriter Mai Kuraki. It is set to be released on November 27, 2019 as a DVD and Blu-ray video release. The release features performances filmed during her concert tour, Mai Kuraki Live Project 2018 "Red It Be": Kimi Omou Shunkashūtō, and is accompanied 40-page booklet.

Background
On October 17, 2019, Kuraki announced the release of the album on her website.

Track listing

Release history

References

2019 video albums